Straume is the administrative center of Øygarden municipality in Vestland county, Norway.  The village is located on the western part of the island of Litlesotra, just south of the village of Foldnes and southwest of the village of Knarrvika.  Straume is the centre of government for the municipality and it is also the centre of commerce for the municipality.  The large Sartor Senter, a regional shopping center is located in Straume.

There is a bridge on Norwegian National Road 555 that connects Straume to the island of Bildøyna, immediately to the west. This bridge is the only road connection to the Øygarden municipality.

Statistics Norway groups Straume and neighboring Knarrevik together as one large urban area for statistical purposes.

References

Villages in Vestland
Øygarden